Ganten is a premium bottled water brand from China. The brand is owned by Shenzhen Ganten Food & Beverage Co., Ltd, a company headquartered in Shenzhen, Guangdong Province. The best known sub-brand of "Ganten" is Baisuishan, or Hundred Year Old Mountain, used for one of the company's bottled water products.

History
Shenzhen Jingtian Food and Beverage Co., Ltd. was established in 1992 in Shenzhen.

Between 2015 and 2017, Shenzhen Ganten's domestic market share in the Chinese bottled water retail market has grown to 3% from 2.4%.

The company's Latinised name is "Ganten", an approximation of the Cantonese pronunciation of the company's name, which is pronounced "Jingtian" in Mandarin. It uses a number of sub-brands for its products in Chinese, including "Ganten" (景田) itself, but the most commonly seen product brand is "Baisuishan", or "Hundred Year Old Mountain". Product packaging often carries the Latinised name "Ganten", but does not Latinise the product brand. As a result, "Baisuishan" branded bottled water is referred to in English simply as "Ganten".

Commercials
A series of commercials for Ganten Water was filmed in Scotland. It was produced by Freakworks, based in Edinburgh: "Ganten: Mesmerise" (2013), filmed in Edinburgh and "Ganten: Source", filmed at Glasgow City Chambers, Stirling Castle, and Smoo Cave in Durness. Both were directed by Hamish Allison and feature the Poland-born model Magdalena Zalejska. The third in the series was also filmed in Edinburgh. The fourth in the series was filmed in 2015 at Dean Village. Another commercial, "Ganten: Pure", was filmed at Blairquhan Castle. Another commercial featuring Jing Tian and Donny Lewis was filmed at Winton Castle. Ganten water is sourced from Huizhou, in Guangdong Province.

Sponsorships
WTT table Tennis tournaments
 Australian Open tennis tournament, since 2018.
 Chinese Super League (football), since 2017
 Juventus FC, since 2017
 FIVB (Fédération Internationale de Volleyball), since 2018.
 FIBA (International Basketball Federation), since 2018
 Serbia national basketball team
 Serbia women's national volleyball team

See also
 Blairquhan Castle, acquired in 2012 by Ganten Scotland

References

External links
 

Bottled water brands
Chinese drinks
Chinese brands